Miraculous: Tales of Ladybug & Cat Noir (also known as Miraculous Ladybug, Miraculous, or Ladybug) is a computer-animated magical girl superhero television series. The series focuses on two Parisian teenagers, Marinette Dupain-Cheng and Adrien Agreste, who transform into the superheroes Ladybug and Cat Noir, respectively, to protect the city from supervillains. The series is co-produced by Zagtoon, Method Animation, Toei Animation, and SAMG Animation with the participation of TF1, AB Droits Audiovisuels, The Walt Disney Company, Gloob, SK Broadband, and EBS.

Prior to its debut in France on 19 October 2015 on TF1, the series was first shown in South Korea on 1 September 2015 on EBS1. In the United States, the series originally debuted on Nickelodeon on 6 December 2015 before the show was removed from the network's schedule in 2016. On 8 April 2019, the series was officially picked up by Disney Channel in the United States and began airing since then. In the United Kingdom and Ireland, the show premiered on 30 January 2016 on Disney Channel and aired until 30 September 2020 when the channel closed in the country, transferring all its content to Disney+.

Series overview

Plot

The series takes place in modern-day Paris and revolves around the adventures of two teenagers, Marinette Dupain-Cheng and Adrien Agreste. When evil arises, they transform into their superhero personas, Ladybug and Cat Noir respectively, using magical jewels known as Miraculouses, which are powered by small animal-themed cosmic beings called Kwamis (they're named Tikki and Plagg respectively). All the while, Marinette and Adrien struggle with their feelings for each other, not knowing each other's secret identities – Marinette is in love with Adrien, but not Cat Noir, while Adrien is in love with Ladybug, but not Marinette.

Their main enemy is Gabriel Agreste, Adrien's father. As the supervillain Hawk Moth, he attempts to claim Ladybug and Cat Noir's Miraculous jewels. Using the Butterfly Miraculous, he creates akumas, butterflies infused with negative energy, to "akumatize" Paris' everyday citizens, turning them into supervillains when they experience negative emotions. He intends to use the jewels to wish his wife Emilie back to life after she had fallen into a coma from using the damaged Peacock Miraculous before the events of the series. He is sometimes aided by his assistant Nathalie Sancoeur, who, using Emilie's jewel as the supervillain Mayura, uses feathers called amoks to create sentimonsters, magical lifeforms with a seemingly endless variety of forms and abilities.

As Hawk Moth's villains become tougher, Master Wang Fu, the Guardian of the Miraculous, allows Ladybug to borrow different Miraculouses and recruit her other classmates and friends as superheroes.

Marinette and Adrien also encounter guitarist Luka Couffaine and fencer Kagami Tsurugi respectively, developing feelings for them, which further complicates their romance. They also become enemies of Chloé Bourgeois, a Ladybug fan and former superhero who turned against her; Lila Rossi, a pathological liar and con girl; and Félix Fathom, Adrien's maternal cousin, who has a vendetta against the Agrestes, especially Gabriel.

Hawk Moth eventually exposes Master Fu, forcing him to make Marinette the Guardian; she starts training under Su-Han, the leader of the Guardians. Nathalie falls ill from using the Peacock Miraculous, so Hawk Moth repairs it and fuses it with his Miraculous to become Shadow Moth, able to create both villains and sentimonsters. Marinette's best friend, Alya Césaire, learns her secret identity, and Luka discovers Ladybug and Cat Noir's identities by accident, but keeps them to himself. Over time, Marinette starts to prioritize Alya and other temporary heroes over Cat Noir, causing a severe strain on their relationship.

Gabriel eventually gains access to almost all of the Miraculous jewels, renaming himself Monarch and in exchange, Félix obtains the Peacock Miraculous, leaving Ladybug and Cat Noir once again the only two heroes.

Monarch attempts to capture the heroes himself, but he is accidentally left with a scar that slowly spreads through his body. Realizing his days are numbered, he turns the Miraculouses into special rings, enabling him to give his supervillains Miraculous powers to make them stronger. Marinette also tries to stop loving Adrien, believing her feelings have become a distraction to her goal in defeating Monarch, but in doing so, she begins to see Cat Noir in a new light; at the same time, Adrien finally lets go of his crush on Ladybug and realizes his true feelings for Marinette. Eventually, Marinette and Adrien truly come to terms with their feelings for each other and begin a romantic relationship, much to Gabriel's disapproval who actively tries to separate them.

Production

Conception and creation 
The series is based on an original concept created by French writer and storyboarder, Thomas Astruc. He was inspired by a meeting with a certain lady and "decades of comics binge reading". In an interview with Nolife, Astruc said he was working as an animator on the show W.I.T.C.H. when he met a woman wearing a T-shirt with a ladybug on it. They began to share drawings, some of which were ladybug-themed. Astruc also noted that Marinette's signature pigtail hairstyle was fashioned after the woman. They also worked on the cartoon A.T.O.M. around 2004–05. Astruc first drew Ladybug on sticky notes and remarked about how strong the Ladybug character was. He had no memories of seeing ladybug-themed superheroes in comics.

Astruc had intended to make Ladybug a comic book series until he met Jeremy Zag, who loved the project and wanted to produce it as a cartoon; Zag was 25 at the time and not originally from the cartoon industry.

In developing Cat Noir, Astruc said that ladybugs represented good luck, so it was natural to partner her with a black cat character with bad luck powers. Cat Noir was a tribute to comic characters, like Catwoman. So it was like having Catwoman and Spider-Man in the same show but reversed genders and roles.

A character named Félix was originally going to have the role of Cat Noir, but he was later scrapped in favor of Adrien Agreste because the creative team felt that Félix was a cliché of a male anime protagonist and that Adrien would allow them to tell more interesting stories. In September 2015, Astruc indicated that he was open to revisiting the character of Félix, but he abandoned it by February 2016, writing that the character was a poor idea. In 2019, Félix was remade as Adrien's cousin and was renamed Félix Fathom.

Hiring companies 
In 2010, the show was announced at Cannes' MIPCOM with French production groups Univergroup Pictures and Onyx Films heading the project and working with Method Animation and Zagtoon. Aton Soumache of Onyx and Method said that they want "to create a glamorous superhero character with a real European flair with Paris as [the] backdrop." The producers had also planned to animate it in stereoscopic 3D (currently, the show is produced using CGI animation).

In the summer of June 2012, Toei Animation Co., Ltd., the famous Japanese animation studio branch owned & operated by Toei Company, Ltd. in Japan, was announced as a co-producer. Two years before 2012, Toei Animation had released a PreCure film that was set in Paris, France and was very interested in expanding their international audience. Even after the production moved to CGI animation, Toei still remained co-producer, with the executive producers from the company being credited.

On 21 November 2012, a memorandum of understanding between Zagtoon, Method Animation, SAMG Animation and SK Broadband was announced: together, the companies would invest US$50 million through 2017 into five projects. The first of these projects was developed into Miraculous, which received an investment of $10 million. As a part of the deal, SK Broadband would have exclusive rights in South Korea for video on demand release, available to the subscribers of the company's IPTV platform B TV.

In 2019, Zag and Gloob signed an agreement where the Brazilian company will start to co-produce the next seasons of Miraculous, in addition to having exclusivity of exhibition in Brazil and the addition of a Brazilian character.

Animation 
When Toei Animation joined as a co-producer in the summer of June 2012, it was also announced that the show would be drawn in a colorful manga-like style. Later in September, Zagtoon, Method, & Toei released a traditionally-animated promotional video for Miraculous Ladybug. The video featured Marinette (in different clothes similar to the clothes in the current series) as Ladybug, and a (now-scrapped, later Adrien's cousin) different character named Félix as Cat Noir, Marinette and Félix's Kwamis, Tikki and Plagg, Hawk Moth / Gabriel (without the mask and with a different outfit, look, and lair compared to the current series), and also two akumatized villains from season 1 in the current show – The Mime and Mr. Pigeon. Their Miraculous and their transformation sequences had a different look similar to the Miraculous and the transformations in the current series. The demo song from the promotional music video was performed & composed by Noam, who would later compose music and perform songs for the current series.

The whole anime concept was a complete success; but there were concerns about the marketability of traditional 2D animation and the difficulty in animating Ladybug's costume of red with black spots, as it caused some strobing effects. Executive producer Jared Wolfson said that Zag wanted the animation to be cinematic and epic, unique and different, and said that they are continuing to partner with Toei as it brings in the Asian inspiration and that a 2D version of the show might be a potential product for future purposes.

The aforementioned problem with 2D animation was resolved by moving to CGI animation; the switch also allowed for easier implementation of mobile camera angles. SAMG Animation, a CGI animation studio located in South Korea which officially joined in the production in the fall of November 2012, produced modeling and animation. Zag later recalled that SAMG was chosen for quality reasons in a video message he sent to a South Korean press conference held in 2015 by the Seoul-based company. Astruc and assistant director, Wilfried Pain, instructed the animators not to improvise scenes so that they could keep things consistent and understandable. Pain estimated about 350–400 shots are used in a typical 20-minute episode; with 10 panels per shot, that makes up to 4000 panels an episode. Wolfson said that the show's animation brings dynamic camera angles and texturing. A trailer with the new CGI-animated style was released in October 2013, a year later.

On 22 January 2018, Zag posted on Instagram that the crew was working on season 4 and season 5.

On 18 April 2021, It was confirmed that in addition to season 4 and 5 the show will have two more seasons (season 6 and 7)

Themes, writing, and process 
While the show is marketed as a Western superhero narrative, its thematic base is the Japanese mahō shōjo (magical girl) genre, with its focus on transformation sequences, a school cast, the gathering of a team of heroes, animal friends, and end-of-episode collages. In particular, Ladybug is strongly influenced by the genre's landmark entry Sailor Moon: Not only does the name of Marinette ("little sailor girl") recall Sailor Moon's title, but the main characters' magical companions reflect Sailor Moon's Luna and Artemis, the main villain's power resembles that of Queen Beryl, and the show's entire plot parallels the story of Sailor Saturn. Ladybug features numerous other direct and indirect references to its inspiration.

The concept for the show originally dealt with political themes, geared towards teens and young adults. However, after failing to gain traction with networks, it was retooled for a younger target audience. Astruc said that he is delighted that the show is able to reach younger and older people.

Each episode takes around 3 months to write, from scratch to final validation of broadcasters. Assistant director, Wilfried Pain, said that each episode is composed of two parts: a sitcom aspect where the characters have to speak for themselves, and an action element where the camera is always moving.

Noam Kaniel writes the music and songs. Kaniel has also worked on action superhero shows such as X-Men, Code Lyoko, W.I.T.C.H., Fantastic Four, Power Rangers, Digimon Fusion and Glitter Force. Kaniel and Zag wrote the theme song. Alain Garcia wrote the English lyrics, which are sung by Wendy Child and Cash Callaway. The French version was performed by Marily and Noam Kaniel.

Release

International broadcast 
Astruc representatives have said that the show has reached over 120 countries. Disney Channel has broadcasting rights in the United States, Europe, the Middle East, and Africa. Japan and Latin America are able to broadcast the series with participation from The Walt Disney Company France specifically, it acquired cable and satellite television rights in Europe, Scandinavia, and Asia, and free-to-air rights in Spain, Germany, Russia and Turkey.

Americas 
 In the United States, the series originally debuted on Nickelodeon on 6 December 2015. The show aired on KidsClick from 3 July 2017 to 29 March 2019, and that run on TV was ended on 31 March 2019 due to low ratings. On 8 April 2019, Disney Channel acquired the rights to broadcast the first two seasons with the third season being aired starting 1 June 2020 and ending 5 December with the episode "Christmaster". Disney later acquired the exclusive rights to stream the series & TV specials on their service, Disney+ worldwide (excluding Brazil, China, & Canada). Disney Channel will premiere all of these seasons and specials first. The first three seasons were only available on Netflix until 1 February 2023, when they moved over to Disney+.
 In Canada, the show premiered in French on 9 January 2016 on Télé-Québec, a provincial public service television network in Quebec. The series was broadcast in English on Family Channel starting on 1 November 2016.
 In Hispanic America, the show premiered on 16 May 2016 on Disney Channel.
 In Brazil, the show premiered on 7 March 2016 on Gloob.

Europe 
 In France, the series premiered on 19 October 2015 on the TFOU programming block on TF1. Season 2 premiered with a Christmas special in December 2016 with further new episodes in France on TF1's TFOU block on 26 October 2017 and other channels throughout Europe. Netflix began streaming the series, starting with the Christmas special, on 20 December 2016. The show also airs on Disney Channel and streams on Disney+.
 In the United Kingdom, the show premiered on 30 January 2016 on Disney Channel (until 30 September 2020); and premiered in February 2017 on Pop.
 The world premiere of season 3 was in Spain on Disney Channel on 1 December 2018. In France, on TFOU, it premiered on 14 April 2019.
 Among the free-to-air terrestrial television broadcasters in the Republic of Ireland, Raidió Teilifís Éireann premiered the show in 2021 on RTÉ2's teenage programming block.
In Ukraine, on 16 November 2017 Pixel TV Released one voice over of Miraculous Tales of Ladybug and Cat noir. After sometime on 1 March 2019 PlusPlus Released one new version of Ukrainian dub. PlusPlus version is who made the world premiere of season 3 last episodes.

Asia-Pacific 
 South Korea was the first country to premiere Ladybug, with girl group Fiestar to sing its translated theme song. It aired on 1 September 2015 on EBS1 and ran for 13 episodes until November 2015, with repeats through February 2016, and the second half of the season began airing on 1 March 2016. SK Broadband, having participated in the production, provided the episodes on video on demand exclusively to subscribers of their IPTV platform B TV,  about a half-hour following the South Korean broadcast of each one on EBS1. The Disney Channel in South Korea has also aired the series as of 7 December 2015.
 In New Zealand, the show premiered on 27 April 2016 on TVNZ's TV2.
 In Japan, Disney Channel streamed the episode "Stormy Weather" through its mobile application on 1 July 2018 before the official premiere on 23 July of the same year.
 It premiered in Southeast Asia on Disney Channel on 6 November 2018, it aired until on 30 September 2021 when the channel closed on 1 October 2021 all in favor for Disney+ and Disney+ Hotstar.
 In Pakistan, the show was telecasted by Kids Zone Pakistan with Urdu dub in 2019. The second season of Miraculous was first aired on 22 October 2021.The third season was aired on 3 May 2022.The fourth season was first aired on 31 December 2022. 
 In India, the first season of Miraculous started airing from 1 May 2019 on Disney Channel. The second season started airing from 14 December 2020 then the third season started airing from 12 April 2021 and the fourth season started airing from 9 May 2022 on the same channel. Also, Miraculous World Special - Miraculous World: New York – United Heroez aired on 9 May 2021 and Miraculous World: Shanghai – The Legend of Ladydragon aired on 14 November 2021 on Disney Channel.
 In Indonesia, the first season of Miraculous Ladybug was aired by Trans7 from 2019 until 11 July 2021 on a graveyard slot.

Reception

Critical reception 
Kimberly Cooper, a blog writer who has contributed to news media such as The Huffington Post, wrote that the show has inspired teens and adults to create and propagate Miraculous remixes and liked that the show featured multiracial characters as with the film Big Hero 6, which had won an Oscar. She "quickly realized there was a far cooler and broader Miraculous movement underway". Caitlin Donovan of the entertainment website, Epicstream, listed it as one of her top 10 animated series of 2015. She wrote that "the characters are so charming that the tropey aspects of the show are merely a lot of fun, rather than irritating" and commended the fight sequences and CGI animation. She wrote that "Marinette is an adorable lead who is genuinely awkward as a civilian, but confident as a superhero, which makes for an interesting contrast." Ella Anders of BSCKids wrote that the show stands out because of "how it meshes both the magical girl and superhero genre together". Robert Lloyd of the Los Angeles Times described the show as "clever, romantic, fun, the way some of us prefer our superhero stories". He found the characters to "have the look of extruded plastic common to CGI cartoons", but "within these limits the design is lovely and the animation elegant, and a lot of work has gone into the staging and execution of the action scenes".

The North American Precis Syndicate called the show "authentic and aspirational – a story of today's modern everygirl superhero who comes to life. The series, about a young girl who taps into her superhero powers and innocent optimism to save Paris from the evil Hawk Moth, will no doubt inspire today's youth to try to save the day, each and every day in their own way." Andrea Reiher of Zap2It wrote that the "storylines are rich with family, friends, adventure, intrigue, villains, creativity and more, delivering themes that are relatable and relevant to kids and preteens" and anticipated it would be a huge hit on Nickelodeon.

The show has also received negative criticism from both critics and fans of the show. Most of the criticism is directed at how Chloe has been written since the third-season finale. Ryan Lewis of CBR.com portrays a negative view of the show's primary conflict between the two main protagonists: 

Several media reviewers have anticipated Miraculous-brand toys to be among the hot superheroine properties for 2016. Zag has partnered with Bandai to release Miraculous-based toys as well as deals to make Miraculous-brand clothing and other merchandise.

Awards and nominations

Media

Spin-off 
A spin-off series, Miraculous Chibi, premiered on 31 August 2018 on YouTube and on major broadcast channels, and since late 2019 on Disney Channel Latin America.
There will also be an upcoming animated musical film called Ladybug & Cat Noir: The Movie released in 2023.

Feature film adaptation 

A movie was first revealed by Jeremy Zag during the "Miraculous" panel at ComiKon İstanbul 2018 on 29 September 2018. On 5 December 2018, it was revealed that the film will be released in 2021. Its plot will be a mix between the origin of the universe and the ending to Season 5. Finishing season 4 and season 5 before the movie is a priority for the studio. The following day, during the Miraculous panel at Comic Con Experience 2018, Zag revealed that film will be a musical and feature music composed by himself.

On 16 May 2019, during Cannes Film Festival 2019, it was confirmed that the movie would be called "Ladybug & Cat Noir Awakening". It was revealed that the production of the movie is underway and that the film is billed as a romantic fantasy adventure. Michael Gracey, the director of The Greatest Showman, is working on the movie too. On 7 June 2019, Jeremy Zag revealed via his Instagram story, a song for the movie called "The Wall Between Us" (Ce mur qui nous sépare), performed by Lou Jean and Lenni-Kim. On 24 July 2019, another song performed by Lou called Noveau Passage was revealed.

On 13 September 2019, the music video for the song The Wall Between Us was released. On 5 October 2019, a short animated teaser featuring Ladybug was put up on Jeremy Zag's Instagram. On 21 December 2019, it was confirmed that the movie would release in late 2021, according to Le Figaro. On 8 January 2020, Jeremy Zag revealed some spoilers from the animated musical.

On 19 February 2020, it was announced that Fantawild is one of the studios helping create and animate the film. On 22 July 2020, it was announced that the animated musical would be released in the autumn of 2021. In May 2021, Jeremy Zag shared the first-ever complete clip on his Instagram of Marinette and Adrien. The film was set to be available on Netflix, making it the only Miraculous related project to be on the service past season 3 as Disney has the rights to most other Miraculous/Zag projects. However, the show itself is set to be pulled from Netflix including the Christmas special episode on 1 February 2023. The films distribution rights are still up in the air.

Stage musical 
In 2021, a stage musical adaptation titled Miraculous Ladybug : Le spectacle musical ( Miraculous Ladybug: The Musical Show) was announced. The musical was originally set to premiere on 21 December 2021, at the Dôme de Paris. However, it was postponed due to the COVID-19 pandemic. It premiered on 20 December 2022, at the Dôme de Paris, where it was played until 1 January 2023. After that, the show went on tour in France, and in French-speaking areas of Belgium and Switzerland.

Manga adaptation 
On 6 December 2020, Zag announced that a manga adaptation will begin serialization in Kodansha's Monthly Shōnen Sirius magazine beginning in the March issue in January 2021. On 20 November 2022, during their panel at Anime NYC 2022, Kodansha USA announced that they have licensed the manga in English.

Game adaptations 
An endless runner video game was developed by TabTale and released in April 2018 as a mobile app. In April 2019 Miraculous Ladybug & Cat Noir was announced as new mobile game and in May 2019 the game was presented by Jeremy Zag.

It was revealed by Venturebeat and Mars Rose that a Roblox game was being produced. Titled Miraculous RP: Quests of Ladybug and Cat Noir, created by Toya Games, it was released in beta on 4 May 2021, and fully released on 2 June the same year. This roleplay game is the first official Roblox game for a TV series franchise and has reached 200 million plays as of September 2021.

On 1 September 2022, a main profile game based on the show was announced, titled Miraculous: Rise of the Sphinx, developed by Magic Pockets and published by GameMill Entertainment for the PlayStation 4, PlayStation 5, Xbox One, Microsoft Windows and Nintendo Switch, and was released on 25 October 2022. The announcement stated that the game would feature both single-player and co-op game modes.

Notes

References

Bibliography 
 Miraculous: Tales of Ladybug and Cat Noir. Authored by Jeremy Zag, Thomas Astruc, Fred Lenoir, Sebastien Thibaudeau, Matthieu Choquet, Nicole D'Andria,a depressed cat, Cheryl Black. Published by Action Lab Entertainment, Inc., 2016. 
 Miraculous: Tales of Ladybug and Cat Noir: Spots on. Authored by Jeremy Zag, Thomas Astruc, Sebastien Thibaudeau, Denis Bardiau, Guillaume Mautalent, Sebastien Oursel, Nicole D'Andria and Cheryl Black. Published by Action Lab Entertainment, Inc., 2016. 
 Miraculous: Tales of Ladybug and Cat Noir: Lucky Charm. Authored by Jeremy Zag, Thomas Astruc, Matthieu Choquet, Leonie de Rudder, Cedric Perrin, Jean-Christophe Herve, Nicole D'Andria and Cheryl Black. Published by Action Lab Entertainment, Inc., 2017. 
 Miraculous: Tales of Ladybug and Cat Noir: Claws Out. Authored by Jeremy Zag, Thomas Astruc, Cedric Bacconnier, Sebastien Thibaudeau, Pascal Boutboul, Michael Delachenal, Nicole D'Andria, and Cheryl Black. Published by Action Lab Entertainment, Inc., 2017. 
 Miraculous: Tales of Ladybug and Cat Noir: Akumatized. Authored by Jeremy Zag, Thomas Astruc, Regis Jaulin, Nicole D'Andria, and Cheryl Black. Published by Action Lab Entertainment, Inc., 2017. 
 Miraculous: Tales of Ladybug and Cat Noir: Cataclysm. Authored by Jeremy Zag, Fred Lenoir, Guillaume Mautalent, Sebastien Oursel, Sebastien Thibaudeau, Nicole D'Andria and Cheryl Black. Published by Action Lab Entertainment, Inc., 2017. 
 Miraculous Adventures of Ladybug and Cat Noir: Volume 1 The Trash Krakken. Authored by Thomas Astruc, Bryan Seaton, Nicole D'Andria, and Brian Hess. Published by Action Lab Entertainment, Inc., 2018. 
 Miraculous: Tales of Ladybug and Cat Noir: De-Evilize. Authored by Jeremy Zag, Thomas Astruc, Matthieu Choquet, Fred Lenoir, Guillaume Mautalent, Sebastien Oursel, Sophie Lodwitz, Eve Pisler, Nicole D'Andria and Cheryl Black. Published by Action Lab Entertainment, Inc., 2018. 
 Miraculous: Tales of Ladybug and Cat Noir: Season Two - Bye Bye, Little Butterfly!. Authored by Jeremy Zag, Thomas Astruc, Matthieu Choquet, Fred Lenoir, Sebastien Thibaudeau, Nolwenn Pierre, Nicole D'Andria and Cheryl Black. Published by Action Lab Entertainment, Inc., 2018. 
 Miraculous: Tales of Ladybug and Cat Noir: Santa Claws Christmas Special. Authored by Jeremy Zag, Thomas Astruc, Fred Lenoir, Sebastien Thibaudeau, Noam Kaniel, Nicole D'Andria and Cheryl Black. Published by Action Lab Entertainment, Inc., 2018. 
 Miraculous: Tales of Ladybug and Cat Noir: Season Two - The Chosen One. Authored by Jeremy Zag, Thomas Astruc, Matthieu Choquet, Fred Lenoir, Sebastien Thibaudeau, Nicole D'Andria and Cheryl Black. Published by Action Lab Entertainment, Inc., 2018. 
 Miraculous: Tales of Ladybug and Cat Noir: Bug Out. Authored by Jeremy Zag, Thomas Astruc, Sebastien Thibaudeau, Matthieu Choquet, Nicole D'Andria, Leonie de Rudder and Cheryl Black. Published by Action Lab Entertainment, Inc., 2018. 
 Miraculous Tales of Ladybug and Cat Noir Coloring Book: Wonderful Coloring Book With Premium Exclusive images. Authored by Evan Owens. Published by Createspace Independent Publishing Platform, 2018. 
 Miraculous Coloring Book: Tales of Ladybug and Cat Noir, This Amazing Coloring Book Will Make Your Kids Happier and Give Them Joy(ages 3-12). Authored by Mrs Qwerty. Published by Createspace Independent Publishing Platform, 2018. 
 Miraculous Coloring Book: Tales of Ladybug and Cat Noir Coloring Book for Kids, Hand-Drawn scenes, Volume 1 (42Pages). Authored by Leya Karsten. Published by Independently Published, 2019. 
 Miraculous Adventures of Ladybug and Cat Noir: Volume 2. Authored by Thomas Astruc, Melanie Duval, Fred Lenoir, Bryan Seaton, Sebastien Thibaudeau, Brian Hess, Darne Lang and Nicole D'Andria. Published by Action Lab Entertainment, Inc., 2019. 
 Miraculous: Tales of Ladybug and Cat Noir: Season Two - No More Evil-Doing. Authored by Jeremy Zag, Thomas Astruc, Melanie Duval, Matthieu Choquet, Fred Lenoir, Sebastien Thibaudeau, Nicole D'Andria and Cheryl Black. Published by Action Lab Entertainment, Inc., 2019. 
 Miraculous: Tales of Ladybug and Cat Noir: Season Two - A New Hero Emerges. Authored by Jeremy Zag, Thomas Astruc, Matthieu Choquet, Fred Lenoir, Sebastien Thibaudeau, Nicole D'Andria and Cheryl Black. Published by Action Lab Entertainment, Inc., 2019. 
 Miraculous: Tales of Ladybug and Cat Noir: Season Two - Double Trouble. Authored by Jeremy Zag, Thomas Astruc, Matthieu Choquet, Fred Lenoir, Sebastien Thibaudeau, Nolwenn Pierre, Nicole D'Andria and Cheryl Black. Published by Action Lab Entertainment, Inc., 2019. 
 Miraculous: Tales of Ladybug and Cat Noir: Season Two - Love Compass. Authored by Jeremy Zag, Thomas Astruc, Matthieu Choquet, Melanie Duval, Sebastien Thibaudeau, Fred Lenoir, Jean-Remi Perrin, Cheryl Black, Nicole D'Andria and Bryan Seaton. Published by Action Lab Entertainment, Inc., 2019. 
 Miraculous: Tales of Ladybug and Cat Noir: Season Two - Tear of Joy. Authored by Jeremy Zag, Thomas Astruc, Wilfried Pain, Melanie Duval, Sebastien Thibaudeau, Fred Lenoir, Nicole D'Andria and Cheryl Black. Published by Action Lab Entertainment, Inc., 2019. 
 Miraculous: Tales of Ladybug and Cat Noir: Season Two - Heroes' Day. Authored by Jeremy Zag, Thomas Astruc, Matthieu Choquet, Fred Lenoir, Sebastien Thibaudeau, Nicole D'Andria, Bryan Seaton, Cheryl Black and Brian Hess. Published by Action Lab Entertainment, Inc., 2020. 
 Miraculous: Tales of Ladybug and Cat Noir: Season Two - Queen's Battle. Authored by Jeremy Zag, Thomas Astruc, Melanie Duval, Fred Lenoir, Sebastien Thibaudeau, Nicole D'Andria and Cheryl Black. Published by Action Lab Entertainment, Inc., 2020. 
 Miraculous: Tales of Ladybug and Cat Noir: Season Two - Bugheads. Authored by Jeremy Zag, Thomas Astruc, Fred Lenoir, Sebastien Thibaudeau, Nicole D'Andria and Cheryl Black. Published by Action Lab Entertainment, Inc., 2020. 
 Miraculous: Tales of Ladybug and Cat Noir: Season Two - Skating on Thin Ice. Authored by Jeremy Zag, Thomas Astruc, Fred Lenoir, Melanie Duval, Sebastien Thibaudeau, Nicole D'Andria and Cheryl Black. Published by Action Lab Entertainment, Inc., 2020. 
 Miraculous Ladybug Coloring Book: Exciting Coloring Pages of the Most Extraordinary Miraculous Ladybug Characters. Authored by Joshua Poche. Published by Independently Published, 2020. 
 Miraculous Coloring Book: Tales of ladybug & cat noir, Amazing Book For Coloring, Knowledge Development, Relaxation And More With Favorite Miraculous Characters. Authored by Odim Publisher. Published by Independently Published, 2021.

External links 

 
 Miraculous at TF1 
 
 Official Japanese Website

 
2010s American animated television series
2020s American animated television series
2015 American television series debuts
2010s French animated television series
2020s French animated television series
2015 French television series debuts
American children's animated action television series
American children's animated comic science fiction television series
American children's animated drama television series
American children's animated science fantasy television series
American children's animated superhero television series
American computer-animated television series
French children's animated action television series
French children's animated comic science fiction television series
French children's animated drama television series
French children's animated science fantasy television series
French children's animated superhero television series
French computer-animated television series
Italian children's animated action television series
Italian children's animated comic science fiction television series
Italian children's animated drama television series
Italian children's animated science fantasy television series
Italian children's animated superhero television series
Italian computer-animated television series
Japanese children's animated action television series
Japanese children's animated comic science fiction television series
Japanese children's animated science fantasy television series
Japanese children's animated superhero television series
Japanese computer-animated television series
South Korean children's animated action television series
South Korean children's animated comic science fiction television series
South Korean children's animated science fantasy television series
South Korean children's animated superhero television series
2021 manga
Kodansha manga
Shōnen manga
Magical girl anime and manga
Action anime and manga
Adventure anime and manga
Science fiction anime and manga
Romance anime and manga
Anime-influenced Western animated television series
Animated superheroine television shows
Magical girl television series
Television shows set in Paris
Toei Animation television
Teen animated television series
Television series by Method Animation
French-language television shows
English-language television shows